The 2006 Matavera by-election was a by-election in the Cook Islands seat of Matavera. It took place on 19 July 2006, and was precipitated by the conviction of former Police Minister Peri Vaevae Pare for fraud.

The by-election was won by Cook Islands Party candidate Kiriau Turepu.  As a result, the government lost its majority, and dissolved Parliament to avoid a confidence vote, precipitating the 2006 general election.

References

By-elections in the Cook Islands
2006 elections in Oceania
2006 in the Cook Islands